Tim Gerresheim (born 24 February 1939) is a German fencer. He represented the United Team of Germany in 1960 and 1964 and West Germany in 1968. He won a bronze medal in the team foil event at the 1960 Summer Olympics.

References

1939 births
Living people
German male fencers
Olympic fencers of the United Team of Germany
Olympic fencers of West Germany
Fencers at the 1960 Summer Olympics
Fencers at the 1964 Summer Olympics
Fencers at the 1968 Summer Olympics
Olympic bronze medalists for the United Team of Germany
Olympic medalists in fencing
Fencers from Berlin
Medalists at the 1960 Summer Olympics